Gulistan Railway Station (Balochi: گلستان ریلوے اسٹیشن) is located in Gulistan village, Killa Abdullah district of Balochistan province of the Pakistan.

See also
 List of railway stations in Pakistan
 Pakistan Railways

References

Railway stations in Qila Abdullah District
Railway stations on Rohri–Chaman Railway Line